Letchworth is a town in Hertfordshire, England.

Letchworth may also refer to:

Places
Letchworth, Arkansas, a place in the United States
Letchworth State Park, a state park in New York, United States
 Letchworth Village, a developmental-disability institution in New York, United States

People with the surname
Eileen Letchworth (1922-2003), American actress
Elizabeth Baldwin Letchworth (b.1959), American lobbyist
William Pryor Letchworth (1823-1910), American businessman

Other uses
Letchworth High School, Gainesville, Florida, United States
, a number of steamships